Steven R. White is a professor of physics at the University of California, Irvine. He is a condensed matter physicist who specializes in the simulation of quantum systems. He graduated from the University of California, San Diego; he then received his Ph.D. at Cornell University, where he was a shared student with Kenneth Wilson and John Wilkins.

He works mostly in condensed matter theory, specializing in computational techniques for strongly correlated systems. These strongly correlated systems include both high-temperature superconductors and quantum spin liquids. He is most known for inventing the Density Matrix Renormalization Group (DMRG) in 1992. This is a numerical variational technique for high accuracy calculations of the low energy physics of quantum many-body systems. His over one hundred seventy papers on this and related subjects have been used and cited widely—his most cited article has received over seven thousand citations.

Awards 
 National Science Foundation (NSF) Fellowship, 1982–1985
 Andrew D. White Supplementary Fellowship, 1982–1985
 IBM Postdoctoral Fellowship, 1988–1989
 American Physical Society, Fellow, 1998
 American Physical Society, Division Councilor for Computational Physics, 1999
 American Physical Society Aneesur Rahman Prize, 2003
 Fellow, American Association for the Advancement of Science (2008)
 Fellow, American Academy of Arts and Sciences (2016)
 Physical Review Letters Milestone Paper of 1992 (Honored 2008)
 Perimeter Distinguished Visiting Research Chair (2012–present)
 Member, National Academy of Sciences (2018)

Most cited publications 
  Cited 2416 times, according to Web of Science, October, 2014;  over 7000 citations, according to Google Scholar, February, 2023.
  Cited 1598 times.
  Cited 657 times.

References

External links 
 
 
 

1959 births
Living people
People from Lawton, Oklahoma
Cornell University alumni
21st-century American physicists
University of California, Irvine faculty
Fellows of the American Physical Society
Fellows of the American Association for the Advancement of Science
Fellows of the American Academy of Arts and Sciences
Computational physicists
Members of the United States National Academy of Sciences